Onex Corporation is an investment manager founded in 1984. The firm manages capital on behalf of Onex shareholders, institutional investors and high net worth clients around the world.  As of September 30, 2022, Onex had approximately US$51 billion of assets under management.

History 
Founder Gerry Schwartz had previously worked at Bear Stearns in New York City during the 1970s, under investor Jerome Kohlberg Jr., who later became a founding partner of Kohlberg Kravis Roberts. Schwartz returned to Canada, where he started working with Izzy Asper.

Schwartz founded Onex in 1984 and took the company public in 1987. The firm focused on private equity investing in North America using capital from its balance sheet for the first 16 years of its history. In 2000, it started raising investment vehicles with third-party capital with the launch of ONCAP, which focuses on smaller and middle market opportunities. In 2003, the first Onex Partners fund was raised. Today, the majority of Onex’ private equity investments are made through these two platforms.

In June 2007, General Motors sold Allison Transmission to financial investors Carlyle Group and Onex Corporation. Together with the Canadian pension fund, Tomkins was taken over in 2010, but Onex only held 14% of the shares.

At the end of 2017, Onex acquired SMG, one of the world's largest event venue operators with over 200 stadiums, arenas, exhibition and convention centers, theaters and science centers worldwide.

In 2019, Onex acquired Gluskin Sheff, a Toronto-based wealth manager with public equity and public credit strategies.

Due to the effects of COVID-19 pandemic, Onex suffered a net loss of $1.1 billion US dollars in the quarter ended March 31.

Private equity investments
Onex Corporation purchased WestJet for $5 billion Canadian Dollars, through its subsidiary Kestrel Bidco in December 2019.

References

External links
ONEX (company website)

 
Financial services companies established in 1984
Companies listed on the Toronto Stock Exchange
Private equity firms of Canada
Holding companies of Canada
Companies based in Toronto
Holding companies established in 1984
Canadian companies established in 1984
Investment companies of Canada
1980s initial public offerings